= Jardim Itu-Sabará =

- Neighbourhood (bairro)
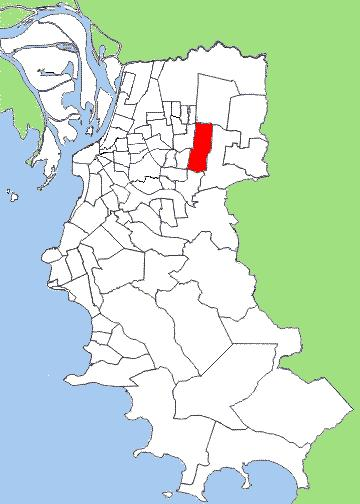
- Jardim Itu-Sabará within Porto Alegre
- Coordinates: 30°01′08″S 51°08′16″W
- Country: Brazil
- State: Rio Grande do Sul
- Municipality/city: Porto Alegre
- Neighbourhood created: 29 October 1968

Area
  - Total: 457 ha (1,130 acres)

Population (2010)
  - Total: 31,790
  - Density: 6,960/km^{2} (18,000/sq mi)

Jardim Itu-Sabará is a neighbourhood (bairro) in the city of Porto Alegre, the state capital of Rio Grande do Sul, Brazil. It was created by Law 3193 from October 29, 1968.

The Jardim Itu-Sabará area begun its division into lots during the 1950s.
